The Whispering Statue is the fourteenth volume in the Nancy Drew Mystery Stories series. It was written by Mildred Wirt Benson, whom many readers and scholars consider the "truest" of the numerous Carolyn Keene ghostwriters, following an outline by Harriet Stratemeyer.  The book was originally published by Grosset & Dunlap in 1937. An updated, revised, and largely different story was published under the same title in 1970.

Plot summary - 1937 edition

Nancy, Bess, and George encounter a troublesome stray terrier on their way to the opening festivities of a new park and recreation complex in River Heights. The terrier grabs the handbag of one of the guest speakers and loses it in a nearby pond. Nancy helps groundskeepers retrieve the handbag and uses the notes found inside to prompt the nervous speaker during her address. She also finds a mysterious personal ad in the handbag. In a casual observation, the "clubwoman," a Mrs. Owen, tells Nancy about a statue on a deserted seaside estate. The statue, known as "The Whispering Girl," bears an uncanny resemblance to Nancy.  As it turns out, Nancy is bound for that very area with her father and her friends Bess and George.  

Reluctantly, Nancy decides to keep  the terrier for a little while, dubbing him Togo (after a famous Alaskan husky, who in turn was named after a Japanese admiral).  Togo follows her to the train station, and she has no choice but to bring him to Sea Cliff with her. On the train, the girls observe a strange elderly woman identified as a Miss Morse, and they suspect a man who has just approached the woman is trying to swindle her. 

Once in Sea Cliff, the girls hunt for the statue that resembles Nancy – and for Miss Morse, who has excited Nancy's curiosity and protectiveness. Further mysterious complications occur when Miss Morse acknowledges that she is being swindled but dismisses Nancy and when Nancy happens to overhear the crook from the train boasting about his conquest.  There are several encounters with quirky but ultimately helpful older men. A seaplane accident leads Nancy to rescue a client of her father who is then linked both to Mrs. Owen and to the mysterious Miss Morse. In the long climactic sequence of the story, Nancy hides behind the statue and uses her voice to make the statue appear to speak to the con man from the train.  She is also captured and tied up, and as she confronts one of the novel's many miscreants, the cliffside mansion falls into the ocean, necessitating another dramatic rescue.

This edition of the novel is considered one of the most ragged, overpopulated, and coincidence-heavy of the series.  It does, however, introduce the enduringly popular Togo, who becomes a mainstay in the series thereafter.  The book is full of atypically harsh episodes, including a man who beats Togo cruelly, apparent elder and child abuse, and some saucy behavior by Nancy herself.  It is perhaps the book most extensively overhauled for the reissue.

1970 revision

Nancy is asked to solve a puzzling mystery, whereupon she encounters a second case. The first mystery concerns a valuable collection of rare books. Wealthy Mrs. Horace Merriam has commissioned a supposedly reputable art dealer to sell the collection, but she now suspects that the man is a swindler who is not giving Mrs. Merriam her portion of the proceeds. The second mystery involves the baffling theft of a beautiful marble statue, which is thought to "whisper," and which bears an uncanny resemblance to Nancy.  She becomes an undercover employee of the dealer, with the alias Debbie Lynbrook. The mystery becomes complicated when the returned marble statue is discovered to be fake. An attempted kidnapping, a nearly disastrous sailboat collision, and an encounter with a dishonest sculptor are just a few of the exciting challenges that Nancy is faced with as she gathers evidence against a clever ring of art thieves.

Artwork

The original 1937 cover art is by Russell H. Tandy, and shows Nancy crouched behind a statue, speaking to a man. Rudy Nappi illustrated the same scene for the 1962 picture cover edition, with updated clothing and hairstyles. Nappi also illustrated the cover of the 1970 edition, which is predominantly blue and white, featuring Nancy's profile behind an overlay of a statue.

Critique 

Adult collectors of juvenile series often discuss artwork and plot elements in various fanzines and list serves. The original story introduces the recurring character of Nancy's dog Togo, who begins as a bull terrier (a popular breed in 1937) but is mentioned as a fox terrier or illustrated as a Scottish terrier in later appearances. The whispering element in the original version is simply Nancy fooling individuals; in a climactic moment, Nancy and Mrs. Conger are swept out to sea inside of a floating house, a somewhat strange and criticized element. In the revision, Nancy and her friends "hide" by kneeling inside three empty picture frames, a somewhat laughable idea. The statue whispers because of special holes drilled in the original that the wind could pass through when positioned in a garden. The artwork on the 1970 cover and interior text illustrations make the statue's resemblance to Nancy undeniable: they both wear their hair in a bobbed flip. Since the statue is a likeness of a long-dead woman, it is anachronistic that the statue sports a hairstyle not popularized until 1960 or later, a point of discussion among critics.

References

External links
 

1937 American novels
1937 children's books
1970 American novels
1970 children's books
Grosset & Dunlap books
Nancy Drew books
Children's mystery novels